Ouvrage Cave-à-Canon is a lesser work (petit ouvrage) of the Maginot Line's Alpine extension, the Alpine Line.  Started in 1937, the ouvrage consists of one infantry block about one kilometer east of Bourg St. Maurice, on the south bank of the Isère. A short gallery with cross galleries extends into the rock, with an emergency exit and ventilation shaft halfway back. The ouvrage was incomplete in 1940, under the command of Lieutenant Courteaud.

Cave-à-Canon, and with Ouvrage Chatelard across the valley to the north, and several pre-1914 forts on the heights around Bourg-Saint-Maurice, were placed to block an advance over the Little St Bernard Pass toward Albertville.

Description
Block 1 (combination): one machine gun turret planned and three machine gun embrasures, three heavy twin machine gun embrasures and one 47mm anti-tank gun embrasure.

The Tarentaise region was liberated by Allied forces in March and April 1945.

See also
 List of Alpine Line ouvrages
 Man caves

References

Bibliography 
Allcorn, William. The Maginot Line 1928-45. Oxford: Osprey Publishing, 2003. 
Kaufmann, J.E. and Kaufmann, H.W. Fortress France: The Maginot Line and French Defenses in World War II, Stackpole Books, 2006. 
Kaufmann, J.E., Kaufmann, H.W., Jancovič-Potočnik, A. and Lang, P. The Maginot Line: History and Guide, Pen and Sword, 2011. 
Mary, Jean-Yves; Hohnadel, Alain; Sicard, Jacques. Hommes et Ouvrages de la Ligne Maginot, Tome 4 - La fortification alpine. Paris, Histoire & Collections, 2009.  
Mary, Jean-Yves; Hohnadel, Alain; Sicard, Jacques. Hommes et Ouvrages de la Ligne Maginot, Tome 5. Paris, Histoire & Collections, 2009.

External links 
 Cave à canons (petit ouvrage de la) at fortiff.be 
 Petit ouvrage de la Cave à Canon at lignemaginot.com 
 Petit ouvrage de la Cave à Canon at wikimaginot.eu 

CAVE
Maginot Line
Alpine Line